Prajakta Koli, known for her YouTube Channel MostlySane, is an Indian YouTuber and actress who makes comedy videos. Her videos are focused mostly on relatable and observational comedy related to daily life situations.

Early life 
Koli was born and brought up in Thane. As a child, she was fond of listening to the radio and decided to be a radio jockey in Class 6. Her father Manoj Koli is a real-estate businessman turned restaurateur and her mother Archana Koli is a phonetics and language teacher. As a student, she participated in debates and elocutions. She studied in Vasant Vihar High School in Thane and later graduated with a Bachelor of Mass Media from V. G. Vaze College of Arts, Science and Commerce in Mulund, affiliated to University of Mumbai.

Personal life 

Prajakta Koli is in a relationship with Vrishank Khanal, who is a lawyer by profession.

Career 
Koli began her career in media as an intern at Fever 104 FM radio station in Mumbai. After interning for a year, she was given her first show, Call Centre, which ultimately flopped and she quit her job. While working as an intern, Koli met future One Digital Entertainment vice-president Sudeep Lahiri, who encouraged her to launch a comedy YouTube channel. Koli launched her channel in February 2015.

Koli has collaborated with mainstream Bollywood actors such as Hrithik Roshan, Kareena Kapoor Khan, Nawazuddin Siddiqui, Vicky Kaushal and Kajol.

She performed at the YouTube FanFest in Delhi in 2018 and in Mumbai in 2019. In December 2018, she recorded a national TV commercial for WhatsApp which deals with the prevention of propaganda and spreading fake news through the messaging app.

In February 2019 she was part of Forbes' list of 30 under 30 and in Outlook Business Magazine's list of Women of Worth and Entrepreneur India's list of 35 under 35 along with winning Cosmopolitan's YouTuber of the Year award. In January 2020, she was included in the annual "Cool list" of the gossip magazine Grazia India, and in April 2020 she was featured on the cover of the magazine BW Businessworld as part of their Most Influential Women's list.

In 2020 she announced the launch of her YouTube Originals show Pretty Fit, where she interviews other celebrities including Kareena Kapoor, Neha Kakkar, Sanya Malhotra, RJ Malishka, Mithila Palkar and Sumukhi Suresh, who are made to perform various tasks. The first episode was released on 21 January.

In July 2020, Koli released a short film, Khayali Pulao, about female empowerment in rural Haryana. She then acted in the Netflix series Mismatched, released in November 2020. In 2022, she was seen in Dharma Productions' film Jugjugg Jeeyo'as Ginny' and Mismatched (Season 2).

 Social initiatives 
On World Mental Health Day in 2016, Koli launched her campaign #iPledgeToBeMe which addresses mental health, well-being and body shaming. She shared her experiences of body shaming and wrote a rap song, "Shameless", in May 2017. The video features Raftaar, RJ Malishka and Mithila Palkar.

In 2018, she participated in the #GirlsCount campaign for One.Org which dealt with the importance of girl's education.

In September 2019, she traveled to the UN Headquarters in New York as a delegate to participate in the International Day of Tolerance and for the Goalkeepers program – an initiative by the Bill and Melinda Gates Foundation.

In May 2018, she was one of the content creators participating in YouTube's Creators for Change program. She made a music video named "No Offence" for her Creators For Change Project, which was shown in the United Nations as part of their International Day of Tolerance, where she represented India.

In a special episode of Creators For Change in 2020, Koli and two other YouTube content creators, Liza Koshy and Thembe Mahlaba, interviewed girls in different countries about their opportunities for education, and discussed the topic with Michelle Obama.

Prajakta represented India at The Call To Unite'' event which started on 1 May 2020 and featured Oprah Winfrey, Julia Roberts, Eva Longoria, Deepak Chopra, Alanis Morissette, Quincy Jones and Mandy Moore among others. The 24 hour 'streamathon' event was organized by UNITE and Room To Read in support of people facing challenges during the pandemic and to promote education among children during the COVID-19 pandemic.

In January 2022, she was appointed Youth Climate Champion by UNDP India. Koli was in Davos to cover the event, where she will touch upon themes of “climate action, social justice, and global healthcare”. She is among a group of six YouTubers picked for the event.

Filmography

Films

Web series

Discography

Singles

References

External links 
 
 
 

Indian YouTubers
Living people
Indian comedians
Year of birth missing (living people)
Comedy YouTubers
YouTube channels launched in 2015